Port Essington is an inlet and historic site located on the Cobourg Peninsula in the Garig Gunak Barlu National Park in Australia's Northern Territory. It was the site of an early attempt at British settlement, but now exists only as a remote series of ruins.

Settlement
In August 1618 Lenaert Jacobszoon, the captain of the Dutch East India Company vessel Mauritius, marked the point on the entrance to what was later called Port Essington, on the Dutch charts as Kape Schildpad (Cape Turtle).

In the early 19th century, the British government became interested in establishing a settlement on Australia's northern coastline in order to facilitate trade with Asia.

Port Essington was named on 23 April 1818 by Phillip Parker King in  'as a tribute of my respect for the memory of my lamented friend, Vice-Admiral Sir William Essington', who was in command of Triumph at the battle of Camperdown in October 1797. Sir J.G.Bremer took possession of the mainland on 20 September 1824 and founded the short-lived colony. A local Aboriginal leader Medlone, also known as Jack Davis, acted as a messenger and manager for relations with the local Aboriginal people.

In 1824 Port Essington was proposed as the first such settlement, but was later passed over in favour of Fort Dundas on Melville Island and Fort Wellington at Raffles Bay. In 1831, a small station was constructed in the area, on Wurango clan land, in the hope of using it as a stopping point for ships, but it was rarely used. When both Fort Dundas and Fort Wellington failed within several years, the Port Essington site was revisited. As a result, a settlement, officially named Victoria Settlement after the young Queen Victoria, but popularly known as Port Essington, was established by Sir J. Gordon Bremer in 1838 and surveyed by Charles Tyers in 1839. It consisted of 24 houses and a hospital. A  description of the harbour and settlement was communicated to the Royal Geographical Society, London, in 1839.

On 24 August 1839 the only play ever staged in Port Essington was performed, the 1797 comedy in five acts Cheap Living by Frederick Reynolds. The set and costume design was by Owen Stanley (1811–1850). The play was performed again in 2010 with a grant from the Government of the Northern Territory, with Tom Pauling, Administrator of the Northern Territory, acting as narrator in the play.

While the British government intended to establish Port Essington as a major trading port, along the lines of Singapore, the new settlement suffered from the same adverse conditions that had previously plagued Fort Dundas and Fort Wellington. The settlement lacked resources and supplies and skilled labour. While some prefabricated buildings were brought from Sydney, many had to be built with what materials could be found in the area, and due to the unskilled nature of the builders, many of these were of poor quality. Disease was also rampant among the small population, and living conditions were poor. Consequently, it struggled to attract settlers, and the post was much-disliked by the troops stationed there.

Setbacks
Port Essington suffered a further setback when the settlement was demolished by a cyclone on 25 November 1839. The cyclone killed twelve people, drove the ship HMS Pelorus aground, and caused a 3.2 metre storm surge. The settlement was rebuilt afterwards, with some stone and brick buildings, due to the assistance of a brick maker who had been shipwrecked during the storm.

Despite these setbacks, there was still widespread hope that Port Essington might be able to break the curse, as evidenced by Ludwig Leichhardt's 1844/1845 expedition. The New South Wales government had hoped to establish a direct line of communication with Asia, India and the Pacific, and supported Leichhardt's journey, which successfully charted an overland route between Moreton Bay (now Brisbane) and Port Essington.

A detailed map of Ludwig Leichhardt's route in Australia from Moreton Bay to Port Essington (1844 & 1845), from his Original Map, adjusted and drawn... by John Arrowsmith was ranked #8  in the ‘Top 150: Documenting Queensland’ exhibition when it toured to venues around Queensland from February 2009 to April 2010.  The exhibition was part of Queensland State Archives’ events and exhibition program which contributed to the state’s Q150 celebrations, marking the 150th anniversary of the separation of Queensland from New South Wales.  

In 1844, a group of convicts, which included trained masons and quarry men among them, was stationed at Port Essington. They were able to build a hospital of some quality at a beacon. This was followed by the 1846 decision of Father Angelo Confalonieri to found a Catholic mission nearby, in an attempt to convert the local population. He had some success, converting around 400 people, but he died of fever in 1848, and the mission died with him. Port Essington was still failing to attract settlers, and it was becoming increasingly clear both that the 1844 works had come too late, and that the settlement was unsustainable. Visiting the settlement in December 1848, soon before its closure, British scientist Thomas Huxley wrote that Port Essington was "most wretched, the climate the most unhealthy, the human beings the most uncomfortable and houses in a condition most decayed and rotten".

Abandonment
Finally, in 1849, Port Essington was, like the two previous attempts, abandoned. The demise of the settlement saw the end of British attempts at occupying the north coast. There would be one further unsuccessful attempt, by the Government of South Australia and Frederick Henry Litchfield in 1864, at Escape Cliffs (also known as Palmerston) near the mouth of the Adelaide River, before the first permanent settlement was established at Darwin (also initially known as Palmerston), in 1869.

The ruins of Port Essington still exist today, and while access is difficult, it is possible to do so by several means. It is possible to fly in through tours that can be arranged in Darwin, or to travel to the area alone by four-wheel drive or boat – although, as the ruins lie on Aboriginal land, a permit must be obtained first. Cabins and some camping sites are available at Black Point Ranger Station.

The Australian industrialist Essington Lewis was named after Port Essington.

References

Further reading
 Cobourg Peninsular historic sites: Gurig National Park. Darwin, N.T. Parks and Wildlife Commission of the Northern Territory. 1999–2000. 7 volumesv. 1. Cobourg Peninsular historic sites conservation plan – v. 2. Executive summary – v. 3. Raffles Bay heritage precinct – v. 4. Victoria Settlement heritage precinct – v. 5. Port Essington heritage precinct – v. 6. Cape Don Lighthouse complex – v. 7. Cobourg Peninsular historic sites original reference documentation. Record at the National Library of Australia
 Alan Powell, World's End: British military outposts in the ring fence around Australia, Melbourne University Press, 2016.
Jim Allen, Port Essington: The historical archaeology of a north Australian nineteenth-century outpost, Sydney University Press in association with the Australasian Society for Historical Archaeology, 2008; . A typescript of the 1969 thesis on which this book is based is available at the Australian National University's Open Research Library
 Mark McKenna, From the Edge: Australia's lost histories, Australian Scholarly Publishing, 2016.

External links

Port Essington, NT Place Names Register Extract
Photographs in 2009 from Northern Territory Library
Bibliography from Northern Territory Library
Search for historic photos on Port Essington

Bodies of water of the Northern Territory
History of the Northern Territory
1838 establishments in Australia
1849 disestablishments
Cobourg Peninsula
Abandoned settlements in the Northern Territory
Inlets of Australia
Ghost towns in the Northern Territory